Steinert Hall (est. 1896) of Boston, Massachusetts, stands at 162 Boylston Street on what was called Boston's "piano row", opposite the Common in the Boston Theater District.

Piano dealers M. Steinert & Sons own the building, erected in 1896 by company employee Alexander Steinert. Architects Winslow and Wetherell designed the "six-story limestone and brick Beaux Arts-style facade with terra-cotta ornament and a copper cornice."

Underground performance auditorium 
Inside the building and four stories below ground is a concert auditorium, now closed, designed in the "Adam-style ... with fluted Corinthian pilasters separating round arches." Around 1911 some considered Steinert Hall the "headquarters for the musical and artistic world of cultured Boston. Lhévinne, Josef Hofmann, Harold Bauer, Anna Diller Starbuck, Fritz Kreisler and many others have made their bows from its platform."

The concert auditorium, now in ill-repair, has not been used since it was closed in 1942 due to new fire code restrictions imposed after the Cocoanut Grove nightclub fire and the prohibitive cost to upgrade the hall.

In May 2015, it was announced that the hall would be renovated in an attempt to open it again for performances.

Notes

References

Further reading 
 Coe, Joshua, "The Secret Underground Theater on Boylston Street", WECB News, Emerson College, December 5, 2013

Vintage advertising

External links

 Bostonian Society. Photo of 146-162 Boylston Street, ca. 1950

Commercial buildings completed in 1896
Boston Theater District
1896 establishments in Massachusetts
Event venues established in 1896
Music venues in Boston